Triangle is the third studio album by Japanese visual kei band Diaura, released on 26 November 2014, by Ains. It debuted on Oricon's weekly chart at the 33rd place, and at the 2nd place on the Indies albums chart. Two singles were released prior to the album, in July 2014, titled "Silent Majority" and "Horizon". A third single titled "Blind Message" was also released on 3 September, however, the song was not included in the album, only its music video was featured on the DVD extra of the B type release.

Track listing 
The album was released in three versions: besides a normal CD version, the A type included a DVD extra with concert footage, while the B type DVD included two music videos.

References

2014 albums
Diaura albums